Randall E. "Randy" Wiles (September 10, 1951 – September 15, 2015) was an American baseball pitcher who appeared in five games for the Chicago White Sox in 1977.

Wiles played with LSU from 1970 to 1972, earning all-SEC recognition in 1972. His seven college shutouts were still an LSU record as of his death in 2015. Wiles was drafted by the St. Louis Cardinals in 1973.

Wiles died after a brief battle with cancer on September 15, 2015.

References

External links

1951 births
2015 deaths
Chicago White Sox players
St. Petersburg Cardinals players
Arkansas Travelers players
New Orleans Pelicans (baseball) players
Charleston Charlies players
Iowa Oaks players
Gulf Coast Cardinals players
Tulsa Oilers (baseball) players
LSU Tigers baseball players
Major League Baseball pitchers
Baseball players from Virginia
Deaths from cancer in Louisiana
People from Fort Belvoir, Virginia